Spitrasaurus is an extinct genus of cryptoclidid plesiosauroid plesiosaur known from the uppermost Jurassic of central Spitsbergen, Norway and likely also Kimmeridge, England. It is named after a syllabic abbreviation for Spitsbergen Travel.

The holotype of S. wensaasi is PMO 219 718 and consists of sixty articulated cervical vertebrae and skull material from a juvenile, and the holotype of S. larseni is ‬SVB 1450 and also consists of cervical vertebrae. A cervical vertebra, MANCH LI 5519c, was found in the Kimmeridge Clay Formation in England and was tentatively assigned to cf. Spitrasaurus in 2014 after being compared to Colymbosaurus megadeirus, while more possible Spitrasaurus vertebrae found at Kimmeridge reside within the collection of Steve Etches.

See also 
 List of plesiosaur genera
 Timeline of plesiosaur research

References 

Cryptoclidids
Tithonian genera
Late Jurassic plesiosaurs of Europe
Jurassic Norway
Fossils of Svalbard
Agardhfjellet Formation
Fossil taxa described in 2012
Sauropterygian genera